The SOMA Museum of Art, formerly Seoul Olympic Art Museum, is a museum in Seoul, South Korea.

See also
List of museums in South Korea

References

External links 

 

Art museums and galleries in Seoul
Buildings and structures in Songpa District
Olympic Park, Seoul